Fekamari is a block at South Salmara-Mankachar district in Assam, India. This is a Block Development of Hatsingimari. This block located the bank of the Jinjiram River.

References

Villages in South Salmara-Mankachar district